The 2003–04 NBA season was the Mavericks' 24th season in the National Basketball Association. During the offseason, the Mavericks acquired Antawn Jamison from the Golden State Warriors, and All-Star forward Antoine Walker from the Boston Celtics. Although the team struggled with chemistry with a 15–12 start, the Mavericks went on a nine-game winning streak in January, and won eight of their final ten games. They finished third in the Midwest Division with a 52–30 record. Dirk Nowitzki was the only member of the team to be selected for the 2004 NBA All-Star Game. With the trio of Nowitzki, Michael Finley and Steve Nash along with NBA Sixth Man of the Year Jamison, the Mavericks continued their reputation as the best offensive team in the NBA. Notable were two rookies, Josh Howard and Marquis Daniels, who made an immediate impact, and were both selected to the All-Rookie Second Team.

However, the Mavericks were eliminated quickly four games to one in the playoffs, losing in the first round to their archrivals the Sacramento Kings. Following the season, Nash signed as a free agent with the Phoenix Suns, Walker was traded to the Atlanta Hawks and later returned to the Boston Celtics in midseason, and Jamison was dealt to the Washington Wizards.

The Mavericks sported gray alternate road uniforms for the season which only lasted one game.

Offseason

Draft picks

Roster

Roster Notes
 Center Shawn Bradley also holds American citizenship, but he played for the German national team and was born in Germany.
 Shooting guard Tariq Abdul-Wahad missed the entire season due to tendinitis in his left knee.

Regular season

Season standings

z – clinched division title
y – clinched division title
x – clinched playoff spot

Record vs. opponents

Playoffs

|- align="center" bgcolor="#ffcccc"
| 1
| April 18
| @ Sacramento
| L 105–116
| Dirk Nowitzki (32)
| Dirk Nowitzki (13)
| Steve Nash (8)
| ARCO Arena17,317
| 0–1
|- align="center" bgcolor="#ffcccc"
| 2
| April 20
| @ Sacramento
| L 79–83
| Dirk Nowitzki (28)
| Marquis Daniels (11)
| Steve Nash (9)
| ARCO Arena17,317
| 0–2
|- align="center" bgcolor="#ccffcc"
| 3
| April 24
| Sacramento
| W 104–79
| Marquis Daniels (22)
| Josh Howard (14)
| Steve Nash (5)
| American Airlines Center20,580
| 1–2
|- align="center" bgcolor="#ffcccc"
| 4
| April 26
| Sacramento
| L 92–94
| Dirk Nowitzki (21)
| Dirk Nowitzki (14)
| Steve Nash (9)
| American Airlines Center20,677
| 1–3
|- align="center" bgcolor="#ffcccc"
| 5
| April 29
| @ Sacramento
| L 118–119
| Dirk Nowitzki (31)
| Dirk Nowitzki (14)
| Steve Nash (14)
| ARCO Arena17,317
| 1–4
|-

Player statistics

Season

Playoffs

Awards and records
 Antawn Jamison, NBA Sixth Man of the Year Award
 Dirk Nowitzki, All-NBA Third Team
 Dirk Nowitzki, NBA All-Star Game
 Josh Howard, NBA All-Rookie Team 1st Team
 Marquis Daniels, NBA All-Rookie Team 1st Team

References

See also
 2003–04 NBA season

Dallas Mavericks seasons
Dallas
Dallas